Bu ol Askar (also Romanized as Bū ol ‘Askar; also known as Bel‘askar and Bulaskai) is a village in Moqam Rural District, Shibkaveh District, Bandar Lengeh County, Hormozgan Province, Iran. At the 2006 census, its population was 437, in 70 families.

References 

Populated places in Bandar Lengeh County